La Bamba is the original motion picture soundtrack album to the 1987 American biographical film of the same name and was released on June 30, 1987 on Warner Bros. Records. The album contained 12 tracks.  In 1988, a second soundtrack album was released, titled "La Bamba Volume 2 - More Music From The Original Motion Picture Soundtrack".  La Bamba Volume 2 consists of 12 songs by the original artists portrayed in the film.

The first six songs of the first La Bamba soundtrack consist of Los Lobos covers of Ritchie Valens' songs: "La Bamba", "Come On, Let's Go!", "Ooh My Head", "We Belong Together", "Framed", and "Donna". Other performers include Howard Huntsberry, Marshall Crenshaw, Brian Setzer, and Bo Diddley performing a new version of his blues classic "Who Do You Love?". Because the movie is a celebration of 1950s rock and roller Ritchie Valens, his music and the music of his contemporaries play a central part in the film.

Track listing
 "La Bamba" – Los Lobos
 "Come On, Let's Go!" – Los Lobos
 "Ooh My Head" – Los Lobos
 "We Belong Together" – Los Lobos
 "Framed" – Los Lobos
 "Donna" – Los Lobos
 "Lonely Teardrops" – Howard Huntsberry
 "Crying, Waiting, Hoping" – Marshall Crenshaw
 "Summertime Blues" – Brian Setzer
 "Who Do You Love?" – Bo Diddley 
 "Charlena" – Los Lobos
 "Goodnight My Love" – Los Lobos

Charts

Weekly charts

Year-end charts

Certifications

References

Los Lobos albums
1987 soundtrack albums
Rock-and-roll albums
Pop rock soundtracks
Heartland rock soundtracks
Rockabilly soundtracks